The 2016–17 Louisiana Tech Lady Techsters basketball team represented the Louisiana Tech University during the 2016–17 NCAA Division I women's basketball season. The Lady Techsters, led by first year co-head coaches Brooke Stoehr and Scott Stoehr, played their home games at Thomas Assembly Center and were members of Conference USA. They finished the season 18–14, 12–6 in C-USA play to finish in a tie for fourth place. They advanced to the semifinals of the C-USA women's tournament where they lost to WKU. They were invited to the Women's National Invitation Tournament where they lost to Southern Methodist University in the first round.

Roster

Schedule

|-
!colspan=9 style="background:#75B2DD; color:white;"| Non-conference regular season

|-
!colspan=9 style="background:#75B2DD; color:white;"| Conference USA regular season

|-
!colspan=9 style="background:#75B2DD; color:white;"| Conference USA Women's Tournament

|-
!colspan=9 style="background:#75B2DD; color:white;"| Women's National Invitation Tournament

See also
2016–17 Louisiana Tech Bulldogs basketball team

References

Louisiana Tech Lady Techsters basketball seasons
Louisiana Tech
2017 Women's National Invitation Tournament participants
Louis
Louis